is a town located in Ibi District, Gifu Prefecture, Japan. , the town had an estimated population of 21,319 in 8,015 households  and a population density of 27 persons per km2, in 8,032 households.

Geography
Ibigawa is located in far western Gifu Prefecture, bordering on Shiga Prefecture to the west and Fukui Prefecture to the north. The Ibi River  flows through the town, which is located in a hilly to mountainous area.  Parts of the town are within the borders of the Ibi-Sekigahara-Yōrō Quasi-National Park.

Climate
The town has a climate characterized by characterized by hot and humid summers, and mild winters  (Köppen climate classification Cfa). The mountainous areas of the town are noted for extremely heavy snow in winter.

Neighbouring municipalities
Gifu Prefecture
Motosu
Tarui
Sekigahara
Ōno
Ikeda
Fukui Prefecture
Ōno
Ikeda
Minamiechizen
Shiga Prefecture
Maibara
Nagahama

Demographics
Per Japanese census data, the population of Ibigawa has declined over the past 40 years.

History
The area around Ibigawa was part of traditional Mino Province. During the Edo period, it initially part of a 30,000 koku domain controlled by the Nishio clan, but from 1623 was divided between territory controlled by Owari Domain and tenryō holdings directly controlled by the Tokugawa shogunate.  During the post-Meiji restoration cadastral reforms, the area was organised into Ibi District, Gifu Prefecture. The town of Ibigawa was formed on July 1, 1889 with the establishment of the modern municipalities system.

On January 31, 2005 the former villages of Fujihashi, Kasuga, Kuze, Sakauchi, and Tanigumi merged with Ibigawa, resulting in a nearly 20-fold increase in area.

Education
Ibigawa has six public elementary schools and five public middle school operated by the town government. The town has one public high school operated by the Gifu Prefectural Board of Education.

Transportation

Railway
 Yōrō Railway Yōrō Line

 Tarumi Railway Tarumi Line
 -- <  > --

Highway

References

External links

 

Towns in Gifu Prefecture
Ibigawa, Gifu
Ibi District, Gifu